3 Monkeys may refer to:

3 Monkeys (2020 film), a 2020 Telugu-language comedy drama film
3 Monkeys (upcoming film), an upcoming Hindi-language heist thriller

See also
 Three wise monkeys